Alka Balram Kshatriya (born 7 November 1959), a politician from Indian National Congress party, is a Member of the Parliament of India representing Gujarat in the Rajya Sabha, the upper house of the Parliament.

External links
 Profile on Rajya Sabha website

Living people
Indian National Congress politicians
People from Mehsana district
Kshatriya Alka
Place of birth missing (living people)
Indian National Congress politicians from Gujarat
1959 births